Kent was a federal electoral district in New Brunswick, Canada, that was represented in the House of Commons of Canada from 1867 to 1968. It was created by the British North America Act of 1867.

It consisted of the County of Kent. It was abolished in 1966 when it was redistributed into Northumberland—Miramichi and Westmorland—Kent ridings.

Members of Parliament

This riding elected the following Members of Parliament:

Election results

See also 

 List of Canadian federal electoral districts
 Past Canadian electoral districts

External links 

 Website of the Parliament of Canada
Riding history from the Library of Parliament

Former federal electoral districts of New Brunswick